The Rwandan Ambassador in Beijing is the official representative of the Government of in Kigali to the Government of the People's Republic of China.

List of representatives

References 

 
China
Rwanda